The Bangladesh cricket team are scheduled to tour England in May 2023 to play three One Day International (ODI) matches  against Ireland cricket team. The ODI series will form part of the inaugural 2020–2023 ICC Cricket World Cup Super League. In March 2023, Cricket Ireland (CI) confirmed that all the matches would be played at Chelmsford in England. It was due to better weather in England than in Ireland and chance of full matches being played to a result.

Background
The Bangladesh team were scheduled to tour Ireland and England in May 2020 to play three ODIs and four Twenty20 International (T20I) matches, with the T20I matches scheduled to take place in England. It would have been the first time that Ireland hosted a series at a neutral venue.

Originally, the tour was scheduled to include a one-off Test match and three T20I matches. However, the Test match was cancelled, with another T20I match added to the tour itinerary. Cricket Ireland made the decision based on the lack of context for the one-off match, and the costs associated of hosting it. A planned home T20I series against Afghanistan was also cancelled by Cricket Ireland. Cricket Ireland confirmed the fixtures for ODI series in December 2019. In December 2019, Cricket Ireland looked at the possibility of hosting the T20I matches in England. In February 2020, the T20Is were confirmed to be taking place in England, along with the dates for the four matches. The venues in England were confirmed the following month. However, on 21 March 2020, the matches were postponed due to the COVID-19 pandemic.

In November 2021, the Bangladesh Cricket Board (BCB) announced that they would play the three ODI matches in Ireland in May 2022, with the aim to play the T20I matches at some point during 2023. In March 2022, as a result of the impact from the pandemic, the International Cricket Council (ICC) agreed to extend the cut-off date for the Cricket World Cup Super League from March 2023 to May 2023, allowing this series to take place.

ODI series

1st ODI

2nd ODI

3rd ODI

References

External links
 Series home at ESPN Cricinfo

2023 in Irish cricket
2023 in Bangladeshi cricket
International cricket competitions in 2023